Claxton is an unincorporated community located in Caldwell County, Kentucky, United States.

References

Unincorporated communities in Kentucky
Unincorporated communities in Caldwell County, Kentucky